Lechitic may refer to:
Lechitic languages
Lechites